MS Victoria may refer to the following ships:

MS Dunnottar Castle, an ocean liner / cruise ship launched in 1936 and later called MS Victoria
MV Kungsholm (1965), an ocean liner / cruise ship previously called MS Victoria
MV Victoria (1959), a ferry formerly the Royal Mail Ship RMS Victoria
MS Victoria I, a cruiseferry built in 2004

See also
 MV Victoria
 SS Deutschland (1900), called SS Viktoria Luise for part of her history

Ship names